The Meizu MX2 is a smartphone designed and produced by the Chinese manufacturer Meizu, which runs on Flyme OS, Meizu's modified Android operating system. It is a previous model of the MX series, succeeding the Meizu MX and preceding the Meizu MX3. It was unveiled on November 27, 2012 in Beijing.

History 
Images of the Meizu MX successor leaked on November 16, 2012. According to this leak, the MX2 no longer has the 3:2 display aspect ratio like the predecessor.

Further leaked images confirming the widescreen display aspect ratio and 4.4-inch display appeared on November 21.

Release 

The Meizu MX2 was officially launched in Beijing on November 27, 2012.
The MX2 became available on the China Unicom network on January 23, 2013.

Features

Flyme 

The Meizu MX2 was released with an updated version of Flyme OS, a modified operating system based on Android Jelly Bean. It features an alternative, flat design and improved one-handed usability.

Hardware and design

The Meizu MX2 features a Samsung Exynos 4412 Quad system-on-a-chip with an array of four ARM Cortex-A9 CPU cores, a Mali-400MP4 GPU and 2 GB of RAM.
The Meizu MX2 reaches a score of 12,194 points on the AnTuTu benchmark.

The MX2 is available in two different colors (black with white and full-white) and comes with 16 GB, 32 GB or 64 GB of internal storage.

The body of the MX2 measures  x  x  and weighs . It has a slate form factor, being rectangular with rounded corners.
The MX2 uses capacitive buttons for menu navigation.

The MX2 features a 4.4-inch IGZO multi-touch capacitive touchscreen display with an HD resolution of 800 by 1280 pixels. The pixel density of the display is 343 ppi.

In addition to the touchscreen input and the front key, the device has volume/zoom control buttons and the power/lock button on the right side, a 3.5mm TRS audio jack on the top and a microUSB (Micro-B type) port on the bottom for charging and connectivity.

The Meizu MX2 has two cameras. The rear camera has a resolution of 8 MP, a ƒ/2.4 aperture, autofocus and an LED flash.
The front camera has a resolution of 1.2 MP and a ƒ/2.2 aperture.

Reception
The MX2 received positive reviews.

FoneArena concluded that “the MX2 stands out from the crowd with a consistently beautiful hardware and software experience that you don’t see on many Android devices these days” and praised the build quality as well as the superb performance of the device.

See also
 Meizu
 Meizu MX
 Meizu MX3
 Meizu MX5
 Comparison of smartphones

References

External links
 Meizu MX2 GSMArena page  Meizu

Android (operating system) devices
Mobile phones introduced in 2012
Meizu smartphones
Discontinued smartphones